Hill's Tramroad was a  gauge plateway for horse-drawn trams that connected the Blaenavon Ironworks to Llanfoist on the Brecknock and Abergavenny Canal.
It ran through the Pwll Du Tunnel, past the Tyla and Pwll Du quarries, through Garnddyrys Forge and on to the Llanfoist wharf.
The tramroad from Pwll Du to Llanfoist was abandoned in 1861 after the railway reached Blaenavon and Garnddyrys Forge was abandoned.

History

In response to a surge in demand for iron during the Napoleonic Wars the manager of the Blaenavon Ironworks, Thomas Hill II, built what became called Hill's Tramroad from Pwll Du to the Llanfoist wharf around 1815.
This linked Blaenavon via Pwll Du and Garnddyrys to the Brecknock and Abergavenny Canal.
It connected Blaenavon to limestone quarries at Pwll-Du and Tyla.
The tramroad passed through the Garnddyrys site in a tunnel.

The plans to build the forge in Cwm Llanwenarth on the west branch of the Blorenge included replacing a steeply sloped section of the tramroad from Blaenavon by a shallow gradient tramroad along the Pwll Du Tunnel, an extension of an  earlier mine tunnel through the hill to Pwll Du.
Hill's Tramroad, a  gauge plateway, was opened from end to end by 1821. 
It carried limestone from the Tyla Quarries, mainly Tyle West, to the Blaenavon Ironworks, and carried cast iron from the ironworks to the Garnddyrys Forge.
From the forge it carried wrought iron to the Llanfoist wharf on the Brecknock & Abergavenny Canal.
It also carried coal and limestone from Pwll Du to the coalyard and limekilns at Llanfoist.

The Dyne-Steel incline railway over the mountain was built about 1850.
The double incline ran up and over the hill above the tunnel, with a steam engine at the summit to haul up the loaded trains.
In 1860 the Garnddyrys works were closed, the forge was relocated to Forgeside, Blaenavon, and the northern branch of the tunnel at Pwll Du was closed.
The tunnel continued to be used to carry limestone to Blaenavon.
The limestone quarries closed after the General Strike of 1926, and the tunnel was no longer used.

Notes

Sources

Horse-drawn railways
Blaenavon